Pennypack Park is a municipal park, part of the Philadelphia Parks & Recreation system located in Northeast Philadelphia in the U.S. state of Pennsylvania.
The Pennypack Creek runs through the park from Pine Road to the Delaware River. The park has playgrounds, hiking and bike trails, and bridle paths for horseback riding. An adjunct to the park is the Pennypack Environmental Center on Verree Road.

More than 150 species of nesting and migrating birds use the park, including the tiny ruby-throated hummingbird, the great blue heron, warblers, the pileated woodpecker, several kinds of seabirds, ducks, geese, hawks, great horned owls and the little screech owl to name only a few.  Famous for its large, scattered deer herd, the park is home to a large variety of mammals, including several kinds of bat, the red and gray fox, rabbits, chipmunks, mice, muskrats, groundhogs, raccoons, skunks, opossum and weasels. The park is home to many reptile species including several kinds of snakes, turtles (including common snapping turtles), frogs, the common toad and several kinds of salamanders.

Many historic structures remain intact throughout Pennypack Park. Built in 1697, the King's Highway Bridge at Frankford Avenue is the oldest stone bridge still in use in the United States.
Pennepack Baptist Church, another of the park's historic sites, was chartered in 1688. During the American Revolutionary War The Verree House on Verree Road was the site of a raid by British troops.
The trained eye can rediscover abandoned railroad grades, remnants of early mills, mill races and other reminders that generations of mankind have gathered in the "Green Heart" of Northeast Philadelphia.

See also

Greenbelt Knoll
List of parks in Philadelphia

External links 

 Friends of Pennypack Park website (archived version)
 Video: A news piece on Pennypack Park from The Philadelphia Inquirer
 Delaware River - Penny Pack Park Tide Times and Heights
 Map of Pennypack Park Trails

Notes

Municipal parks in Philadelphia
Holmesburg, Philadelphia